Moel y Garnedd is a hill within the Snowdonia National Park in Gwynedd, North Wales.

Location and Summit View
It is the high point of an area of moorland known as the Gwastadros. Cadair Berwyn and Bala Lake are to the east / southeast, and to the southwest is Aran Benllyn, Cadair Idris and Dduallt. The furthest feature visible is Fron Hafod hill, within the Llandegla Forest,  distant.

Ascent
A scenic route to the summit begins in nearby Bala and takes approximately two to three hours for a round trip. The summit is marked by an Ordnance Survey trig point.

References

Mountains and hills of Gwynedd
Llandderfel